The Lotto Cross Cup de Hannut is an annual cross country running competition that takes place in Hannut in the Belgian province of Liège. It holds permit meeting status from the European Athletic Association and attracts top athletes from Europe and Africa.

Typically held in January or February, the competition was created as a men's only event in 1941 and in its first decade a number of Belgian champions competed, including Gaston Reiff and Marcel Vandewattyne. It became increasingly international in nature and the 1950s saw Olympic medallists top the podium, such as Derek Ibbotson, Gordon Pirie and Franjo Mihalić. Despite the growth of foreign competition, Gaston Roelants (the 1964 Olympic steeplechase champion) was dominant at the competition in the 1960s and two more Belgian Olympians, Emiel Puttemans and Vincent Rousseau, extended the national-level success from the mid-1970s through to the 1990s. A women's race was introduced in 1977 and attracted high level foreign competition from 1990 onwards.

The quality of the competition at the race declined in the 1990s, but this trend was reversed when it became part of the Lotto Cross Cup series of Belgian races, which also includes an international meeting in Brussels. Having been held every year since 1941, bar 1945–1946, the Lotto Cross Cup de Hannut is one of the longest running competitions of its type in Belgium. Since 2000, the senior races have seen an increase in participation from (and victories by) Kenyan and Ethiopian runners in both the men's and women's sections.

The event currently holds four principal races each year: a men's race of 10.5 km, a women's race of 6 km, a junior men's race of 6.5 km, and a junior women's race of 4.5 km. There are also a series of younger age-category races, masters races for older runners. Aside from these, there are two further recreational events bearing the names of top Belgian runners of the past: the "5 km Véronique Collard" for women and the "10 km Leon Schots" for men. The courses for the competition take place on a series of three loops of vary lengths, which are set in the grounds surrounding the Stade Lucien Gustin (the stadium of the local athletics club FC Hannut Athlétisme). It is usually a flat and grassy course, although occasionally muddy in wet weather.  The current race director is Jos Van Roy.

Past senior race winners

Early men's race

Men's and women's race

Note that times are not comparable due to the variance of the race distance over the competition's history (from 7 km up to 14 km) and the effects of weather conditions.
† Note: the event was held in February between 1941 and 1975. Held once in March in 1976, it was rescheduled for November from 1978 to 1982. It reverted to its February timing in 1984, skipping 1983 altogether. It has been mostly held in late January since 1993.

References

List of winners
Michiels, Paul et al. (2012-01-23). Hannut Cross. Association of Road Racing Statisticians. Retrieved on 2012-01-23.

External links
Official webpage
Lotto Cross Cup website

Cross country running competitions
Athletics in Belgium
Sport in Liège Province
Recurring sporting events established in 1941
Cross country running in Belgium
Annual sporting events in Belgium
1941 establishments in Belgium
Hannut